Agitations is the third full-length album from punk rock band Cobra Skulls, as well as their first full-length for Fat Wreck Chords.  The album was released on September 27, 2011.

Track listing

Personnel 
 Devin Peralta - vocals, bass
 Adam Beck - guitar
 Luke Swarm - drums

References 

Cobra Skulls albums
2011 albums
Fat Wreck Chords albums